The 1975 Individual Long Track World Championship was the fifth edition of the FIM speedway Individual Long Track World Championship. The event was held on 14 September 1975 in Gornja Radgona, Slovenia which was Yugoslavia at the time.

The world title was won by Egon Müller of West Germany for a second time.

Final Classification 

Key
 E = eliminated (no further ride)

References 

1975
International sports competitions hosted by Yugoslavia
Motor
Motor